The Gippsland line (also known as the Orbost railway line) is a railway line serving the Latrobe Valley and Gippsland regions of Victoria, Australia. It runs east from the state capital Melbourne through the cities of Moe, Morwell, Traralgon, Sale and terminating at Bairnsdale.

Prior to its dismantling in 1994, the line extended to Orbost. The dismantled section now comprises the East Gippsland Rail Trail, a shared bicycle, walking, and horseriding track.

Services
Metro Trains Melbourne operates suburban passenger services along the inner section of the line as the Pakenham line, while V/Line services operate as the Traralgon and the Bairnsdale lines. Freight services also use the line, operated by Qube Holdings.

History

Rail lines were built to Gippsland in the 1870s and initially played a crucial role in developing agricultural industries in Gippsland as well as tourism. It also played a crucial role in the development of coal mining in the Latrobe Valley in the 1920s. At its peak, the railway travelled as far east as Orbost, and there are still frequent services to many of the towns. Some of the disused rail lines have been turned into tourist railways and/or rail trails.

The Melbourne and Suburban Railway Company opened a line from Princes Bridge railway station to Punt Road (Richmond) and South Yarra in 1859, Prahran in 1859 and Windsor in 1860, connecting with the St Kilda and Brighton Railway Company line. This line was extended to Dandenong, Pakenham, Warragul, Moe, Morwell, Traralgon, Sale, Stratford and Bairnsdale between 1877 and 1879. It was extended to Orbost in 1916.

The railway to Orbost opened in 1916 and operated until 1987, principally carrying timber and farming produce. In the early days of the railway's operation, dedicated passenger trains ran, but they had ceased by the 1930s. The track infrastructure was dismantled in 1994. The line traversed a mixture of farmland, hills and heavily forested country, and included numerous bridges, including the Stoney Creek trestle bridge, the largest of its kind in Victoria.

In 1954, the line from Dandenong to Traralgon was electrified, mainly because of the expected briquette traffic from the brown coal mines in the Latrobe Valley. Over the next two years most of the line between Dandenong and Pakenham was duplicated and provided with power signalling, although the Narre Warren to Berwick section was not done until 1962. Over time, the rail transport of briquettes petered out as industry converted to natural gas and homes were converted to other forms of heating.

Electrification was cut back to Warragul in 1987, with suburban-style trains providing the services from there to Melbourne. Electrification was further cut back to Bunyip in 1998, before ceasing entirely beyond Pakenham in 2001. The line east of Sale was closed in 1994, but was reopened to Bairnsdale in 2004. In 2005, the Regional Fast Rail project upgraded one of the two lines between Pakenham and Traralgon. This project also included removing the remaining electrification infrastructure from Pakenham East to Traralgon, with the exception of a heritage-listed length in Bunyip.

Branch lines 

A branch line was built north from Warragul in stages from the 1890s, reaching Noojee in 1919. It was closed in stages from 1954 to 1958.

In 1910, the  narrow gauge Walhalla branch line was completed through mountainous country from Moe to Erica and Walhalla. The Platina to Walhalla section closed in 1944, Erica to Platina in 1952, and Moe to Erica in 1954. The northernmost section, between Thomson and Walhalla stations, has been reopened as a tourist railway by the Walhalla Goldfields Railway, and provides regularly scheduled trains.

A branch line was also opened from Moe to Thorpdale in 1888, which was closed in 1958.

The Yallourn branch was opened from Hernes Oak (between Moe and Morwell) to Yallourn in 1922 to serve the adjacent power station development. It was replaced by a line from Moe to Yallourn in 1953 because its route was required for brown coal mining, but the new line closed in 1987, having been disused since the late 1970s.

The Mirboo North branch line was opened in stages from Morwell to Mirboo North between 1885 and 1886; however, it was closed in 1974. The route of the line was partly dug up as part of the Hazelwood open cut mine. The Maryvale paper siding also connects to the main line at Morwell and remains open today for regular freight traffic.

The loop line via Maffra was opened from Traralgon to Heyfield, Maffra and Stratford in 1887, which was closed in stages between 1987 and 1993. A branch line was opened from Maffra to Briagolong in 1889 and closed in 1952.

There used to be several timber tramways running to a number of the stations between Pakenham and Yarragon.

Significance 
The expansion of the railway in the late 1870s helped to develop Gippsland. It enabled milk from western Gippsland to be sold fresh into Melbourne while the dairy industry of East Gippsland provided cheese and butter. It also enabled development of west Gippsland's market gardening and orcharding industry for sale in Melbourne markets.

It also encouraged the development of a tourism industry notably at Lakes Entrance. It did, however, end coastal shipping traffic and the use of Sale and Bairnsdale as ports.

In the 1920s, the Gippsland railway played an important role in developing the mining of lignite coal and the development of the Latrobe Valley for power generation primarily serving Melbourne and Victoria. This saw the development of industry in towns such as Yallourn, Morwell, Traralgon, Moe, Warragul and Drouin.

The development of the Gippsland Railway helped fuel the Melbourne land boom in the 1870s. The original departure point for the railway was Oakleigh with the line connecting Oakleigh and Melbourne not built until 1879. The Victorian Railways bought land in Oakleigh for use as workshops. Oakleigh became a centre of what was known as "railway fever" as developers developed and marketed houses close to rail lines between Oakleigh and other suburbs for use of workers travelling to and from their job. At the height of the land boom in 1888, land sales were being held two or three times a week in the district. The collapse of the land boom in 1889 eventually contributed to banking collapses in 1893, and the major depression of the 1890s.

The Gippsland railway remains a significant passenger corridor on the V/Line network, although its use for freight business has now declined to only one major customer, being Australian Paper's export traffic from its mill in Maryvale.

Tourist railways and rail trails 

Many of the lines in Gippsland have closed because they had become uneconomic. Some of these have been turned into tourist railways, and other bits into rail trails.
The only tourist railway left operating is the Walhalla Goldfields Railway between Moe and Walhalla. Until 2016, the South Gippsland Railway operated services between Leongatha and Nyora, via Korumburra, however, services ceased in 2015 and the line is now being converted to a rail trail.

Other stretches of line have become rail trails for use by bicyclists. These include:

 the Noojee Trestle Bridge Trail in the upper reaches of the Latrobe River;
 a section between Erica and the Thomson River on the former Walhalla line (pending eventual reconstruction of the Walhalla Goldfields Railway's tourist line between Thomson and Erica stations).;
 Collins Siding to Tyers Valley Rail Trail near Moe;
 Moe to Yallourn Rail Trail;
 Mirboo North to Boolarra Rail Trail;
 Great Southern Rail Trail from Leongatha to Foster; with extensions under construction to a planned length from Nyora to Yarram.
 Bass Coast Rail Trail Anderson to Wonthaggi;
 East Gippsland Rail Trail from Bairnsdale to Nowa Nowa and Orbost; and the
 Gippsland Plains Rail Trail from Stratford to Maffra.

References

External links 
South Gippsland Railway
Statistics and detailed schematic map at the vicsig enthusiast website

History
City of Monash page on the Gippsland Railway
Gippsland Rail Trails
Monash University gazeteer on Oakleigh 
Monash University gazeteer on Moe

Railway lines in Victoria (Australia)
Railway lines opened in 1859
1859 establishments in Australia
Transport in Gippsland (region)
Shire of East Gippsland
Shire of Baw Baw
Shire of Wellington
Transport in the City of Stonnington
Transport in the City of Yarra
Public transport routes in the City of Melbourne (LGA)
Transport in the City of Monash
Transport in the City of Glen Eira
Transport in the City of Kingston (Victoria)
Transport in the City of Greater Dandenong
Transport in the City of Casey
Transport in the Shire of Cardinia